Victor Rusu (born 1953) is a politician, journalist, and activist from Moldova. He served as Mayor of Nisporeni and a leader of the Social Liberal Party (Moldova). He has been the leader of the Liberal Democratic Party of Moldova in Nisporeni since February 2008. He has a show on Vocea Basarabiei radio station.

Awards

Victor Rusu was awarded, by a presidential decree, with Romania's highest state decoration – the Order of the Star of Romania.
He was also awarded the state diploma

References

External links 
 Victor Rusu: „Diacov şi Roşca se comportă de parcă le-ar fi dat cineva zestre un anumit număr de alegători”
 Mr. Vrabie offers the state diploma to the mayor of Nisporeni city
 Mayor of Nisporeni, Mr. Victor Rusu
 One more group of former social-liberals refuses to be a part of

1953 births
Moldovan activists
Euronova Media Group
Liberal Democratic Party of Moldova politicians
Moldovan journalists
Male journalists
Living people